Nicholas Law (born 8 September 1961) is an English former professional footballer and football manager who is the Head of Youth Recruitment at Premier League side Burnley.

He previously played as a defender notably for Barnsley, Rotherham United and Chesterfield. He became manager of the latter between 2000 and 2001 and later went on to take charge at 
Bradford City, Grimsby Town and Buxton.

Playing career
Law played as a defender between 1981 and 1997 for Barnsley, Blackpool, Plymouth Argyle, Notts County, Scarborough, Rotherham United, Chesterfield and Hereford United. He began his professional career at Arsenal, but his first team involvement was limited to a single appearance on the substitute's bench in a 1–5 defeat at Aston Villa on 24 April 1979.

Managerial and coaching career

Chesterfield
Law was made Football in the Community officer with Chesterfield before taking over as manager from John Duncan in the spring of 2000. The change was too late to save the Spireites from relegation in 1999–2000, but with some shrewd signings by Law, the team dominated Division Three in 2000–01 and led the table, until the pressures of the Football League enquiry into financial irregularities started to impact on performances. Despite a nine-point deduction, Law nevertheless led Chesterfield to third place and automatic promotion to Division Two.

Bradford City
On 1 January 2002, Law joined First Division side Bradford City replacing Jim Jeffries as manager. He was sacked in November 2003 during which the club was in administration and second from bottom of league.

Grimsby Town
Law was appointed manager of Second Division Grimsby Town on 3 March 2004. The Mariners had recently dismissed Paul Groves and were struggling in the lower mid-table of the third-tier of English football following relegation from the First Division a few months earlier. He turned his attention to the transfer market and acquired John Thorrington, Alan Fettis, Paul Warhurst and Mickaël Antoine-Curier amongst others. However, in the final twelve games of the season Law only posted three victories, two draws and seven defeats which confined Grimsby to a second successive relegation. Law was dismissed as a result and was replaced by Russell Slade.

Alfreton Town
On 14 May 2007, he was appointed as manager of Alfreton Town. In March 2008 he was set to return to Bradford as manager of Bradford Park Avenue, until Park Avenue were forced to call off the deal and apologise to Alfreton Town.

On 25 May 2011, Law signed a new contract along with assistant Russ O'Neill keeping them with the club till June 2014.

Burnley
On 25 January 2017, it was announced that Law would join Premier League Burnley as head of national recruitment for 17-23 year olds.

Honours

Manager 
Chesterfield
Division Three third place, promoted: 2000–01

Buxton
Northern Counties East Football League Premier Division: 2005–06
Northern Premier League First Division: 2006–07

Alfreton Town
Conference North: 2010–11

References

Panini (1988). Panini's Football Yearbook 1988–89, Panini Publishing,

External links

Law's Post War English & Scottish Football League A - Z Player's Transfer Database profile's statistics site

Nicky Law page at the League Managers Association
Law moves to Bradford article on BBC website

1961 births
Living people
Footballers from Greenwich
English footballers
Association football defenders
Arsenal F.C. players
Barnsley F.C. players
Blackpool F.C. players
Plymouth Argyle F.C. players
Notts County F.C. players
Scarborough F.C. players
Rotherham United F.C. players
Chesterfield F.C. players
Hereford United F.C. players
English Football League players
English football managers
Chesterfield F.C. managers
Bradford City A.F.C. managers
Grimsby Town F.C. managers
Buxton F.C. managers
Alfreton Town F.C. managers
Burnley F.C. non-playing staff
English Football League managers
National League (English football) managers